The mountain myzomela (Myzomela adolphinae), also known as elfin myzomela or midget myzomela, is a species of bird in the family Meliphagidae.
It is found in New Guinea. Its natural habitats are subtropical or tropical moist lowland forests and subtropical or tropical moist montane forests.

This species was named in honour of Adolphine Susanna Wilhelmina Bruijn.

References

mountain myzomela
Birds of New Guinea
mountain myzomela
Taxonomy articles created by Polbot
Taxa named by Tommaso Salvadori